Sekolah Menengah Kebangsaan Taman Tunku (SMK Taman Tunku) is a government-run secondary school located in Miri, Sarawak, Malaysia. It was built in July 2001 and completed on 4 September 2003. The school began its operation on 5 January 2004.

Secondary schools in Malaysia
Miri, Malaysia